Sittin' on Top of the World is the third studio album by American singer LeAnn Rimes, released in the United States on May 5, 1998, by Curb Records. The album has been certified Platinum.  It contains cover versions of "Insensitive" by Jann Arden, "Sittin' on Top of the World" by Amanda Marshall, "Purple Rain" by Prince, and "Rock Me (In the Cradle of Love)" by Deborah Allen. The album also includes two singles which were released to country radio: "Commitment" and "Nothin' New Under the Moon".

Critical reception

Stephen Thomas Erlewine of AllMusic gave the album 2.5 out of 5 stars, writing that "Only three songs have any country feel to them, and they just barely fit that description…Most of the record consists of mid-tempo pop songs".

Track listing

Personnel 
Compiled from liner notes.

 LeAnn Rimes – lead vocals, backing vocals (4, 5, 8, 11, 13), percussion (9)
 Steve Nathan – keyboards (1)
 Gary Leach – keyboards (1, 2, 4, 5, 10, 11, 13, 14), backing vocals (1-7, 9, 10, 12, 13, 14), acoustic piano (3, 9, 13, 14), acoustic guitar (13), arrangements
 Kelly Glenn – keyboards (3, 8, 15), acoustic piano (7), backing vocals (15)
 Randy Fouts – acoustic piano (6, 12)
 Marty Walsh – electric guitar (1, 3, 4, 5, 7, 8, 9, 11, 13, 14), acoustic guitar (1, 4, 5, 7, 9, 14)
 Glynn Flemming – electric guitar (2, 15)
 Jerry Metheny – electric guitar (2, 7, 9, 11, 13, 15), acoustic guitar (3, 10)
 Milo Deering – acoustic guitar (1, 6, 8, 11-15), mandolin (5), steel guitar (5-8, 12, 14), electric guitar (6, 12), fiddle (6, 8, 10), dobro (10)
 Kevin Bailey – acoustic guitar (3, 10)
 Junior Knight – acoustic guitar (3), steel guitar (9)
 Curtis Randall – bass (1-5, 7-11, 13, 14, 15), backing vocals (9, 15)
 Bob Gentry – bass (6, 12), assisting arrangements
 Dan Wojciechowski – drums
 Carl Albrecht – percussion (1, 4, 5, 10, 11, 13)
 Fred Glieber – percussion (3, 7)
 Greg Hunt – assisting arrangements
 Wilbur C. Rimes – assisting arrangements
 Perry Coleman – backing vocals (1, 5, 13, 14)
 Chastity Marie – backing vocals (1, 5, 14)
 Stephanie Marie – backing vocals (1, 5, 14)
 Rita Baloche – backing vocals (3, 6, 7, 10, 12)
 Debi Lee – backing vocals (3, 4, 7, 10)
 Matthew Ward – backing vocals (3, 4, 7, 10)
 Terry Casburn – backing vocals (6, 12)
 Bryan White – backing vocals (8)

Production 
 Wilbur C. Rimes – producer, mixing 
 Greg Hunt – chief engineer, mixing, mastering 
 Austin Deptula – assistant engineer, editing
 Gary Leach – assistant engineer, mixing, editing
 J. B. Patterson – assistant engineer
 Doug Sax – mastering
 The Mastering Lab (Hollywood, California) – mastering location 
 Sue Allen – design coordinator 
 Glenn Sweitzer and Fresh Design – art direction, design 
 Andrew Eccles – photography
 Trish Townsend – wardrobe stylist 
 Debra Wingo – hair stylist, make-up

Charts
Sittin' on Top of the World debuted at #4 on Billboard 200 in its 1st week with 156,500 copies sold, it peaked at #3 in its 2nd week. The album spent 3 weeks in top 10 and 37 weeks in Billboard 200.

Weekly charts

Year end-chart

Sales

References

1998 albums
Curb Records albums
LeAnn Rimes albums